The Indian locomotive class WAM-1 is a class of 25 kV AC electric locomotives that was developed in late 1950s by the Groupement 50Hz ( a consortium of European locomotive manufacturers) for Indian Railways. The model name stands for broad gauge (W), AC Current (A), Mixed traffic (M) engine, 1st generation (1). They entered service in 1960 thus making them  India's first AC electric locomotive. A total of 100 WAM-1 were built by the European consortium between 1959 and 1961, which made them the most numerous class of mainline electric locomotive until the WAG-1.

The WAM-1 served both passenger and freight trains for over 40 years. This class though was initially not a great success provided the basic design for the WAM-4 which a number of other locomotives is based on. However, with the advent of new 3-phase locomotives like WAP-5 and WAP-7, the aging fleet of WAM-1 locomotives were relegated to hauling freight and doing shunting duties. Now the WAM-1 locomotives have been fully withdrawn from service and all except one have been scrapped. The single surviving unit named 'Jagjivan Ram' has been preserved at NRM New Delhi.

Locomotive shed 
  All the locomotives of this class has been withdrawn from service.

See also

Rail transport in India#History
Indian Railways
Locomotives of India
Rail transport in India

References

External links 

[IRFCA] Indian Railways FAQ: Locomotives—Specific classes : AC Electric
[IRFCA] Indian Railways FAQ: Diesel and Electric Locomotive Specifications

25 kV AC locomotives
B-B locomotives
Electric locomotives of India
Railway locomotives introduced in 1959
5 ft 6 in gauge locomotives